Myeongdeok Station is a station of Daegu Subway Line 1 in Namsan-dong, Jung District, Daegu, South Korea. On March 13, 2009, an entrance elevator was installed. There is connection track to the No. 2 subway line between Banwoldang station and Myeongdeok station.

Station layout

Around the station
 Gyeongbuk Girls' Commercial High School
 Namsan-dong Post Office
 Daegu Myeongdeok Elementary School
 Woori Bank Myeongdeok Branch
 Prince Hotel
 Gyeongbuk Arts High School
 Daemyeong 2-dong Administrative Welfare Center
 Capital Mansion
 Dongdaegu Nonghyup Namsan Branch
 Gyeongbuk Girls' High School
 Nammun Market
 Namsan 1-dong Administrative Welfare Center
 Daegu Bank Nammun Market Branch
 Catholic Church Daegu Archdiocese Namsan Cathedral
 Catholic Daegu Archdiocese Office
 Daegu Catholic University College of Theology
 February 28 Democracy Movement Memorial Hall
 Cho Eunsori Hearing Aid
 Top Mart Daegu

External links 
 DTRO virtual station

Jung District, Daegu
Railway stations opened in 1997
Daegu Metro stations